St. George's-Stephenville East is a defunct provincial electoral district for the House of Assembly of Newfoundland and Labrador. Created in 1995 from the districts of St. George's and Stephenville. In 2011, there were 7,861 eligible voters living within the district.

The district runs the length of Bay St. George (excluding Port au Port Peninsula) and all along the district of Humber West. Apart from parts of Stephenville, the district includes communities of Barachois Brook, Benoit's Siding, Black Duck Siding, Cape Anguille, Cartyville, Coal Brook, Codroy, Codroy Pond, Cold Brook, Doyles, Flat Bay, Great Codroy, Gypsumville, Heatherton, Highlands, Jeffrey's, Journois Brook, Loch Leven, Loch Lomond,  Maidstone, Mattis Point, McDougals, McKay's, Millville, Noels Pond, O'Regan's, Red Rocks, Robinsons, Robinson's Station, St. Andrew, St. David's, St. Fintan's, St. George's, St. Teresa, St. Teresa's Station, Searston, South Branch, Stephenville Crossing, The Block, Tompkins, Upper Ferry, and Woodville.

The district was abolished in 2015, and was succeeded by the new district of Stephenville-Port au Port.

Members of the House of Assembly

St. George's-Stephenville East/Stephenville

St. George's/ St. Georges-Port-au-port

Election results 
}
|-

|-

|align="right"|948
|align="right"|25.36
|align="right"|-23.95
|-
 
|NDP
|Bernice Hancock
|align="right"|579
|align="right"|15.49
|align="right"|-1.03

|}

|-

|-

|-
 
|NDP
|Bernice Hancock
|align="right"|705
|align="right"|16.52
|align="right"|N/A
|-
 
|Independent
|Dean Simon
|align="right"|62
|align="right"|1.45
|align="right"|N/A

|}

|-

|-

|}

|-

|-

|-

|Independent
|Nancy Critchley
|align="right"|170
|align="right"|3.06 
|align="right"|

|}

|-

|-

|}

|-

|-

|}

References

External links 
Website of the Newfoundland and Labrador House of Assembly

Newfoundland and Labrador provincial electoral districts
Stephenville, Newfoundland and Labrador